Daniel Christopher Flanagan (24 November 1924 – January 2019), also known as Donal Flanagan, was an Irish amateur footballer who played as a centre forward. He was also a sprinter and rugby union player.

Football career
Born in Dublin, Flanagan played for St James's Gate, Dundalk, Huddersfield Town, Notts County, Shelbourne, Manchester City and Bradford City.

He scored a hat-trick on his League of Ireland debut for St James's Gate at the age of 18. He was close to signing with Bohemians, but their schedule clashed with his rugby career and he signed for Dundalk instead.

He scored 2 goals in 2 League games for Notts County, but declined professional terms and returned to Ireland, before signing for Manchester City.

For Bradford City he made 13 appearances in the Football League, scoring 6 goals.

Other sports
Flanagan was also a sprinter, and in 1943 won the national titles at 60, 100 and 220 yards, and was runner-up in the 440 years to his brother Brendan. He was also an amateur rugby player who played for Bective Rangers.

Sources

References

1924 births
2019 deaths
Republic of Ireland association footballers
St James's Gate F.C. players
Dundalk F.C. players
Notts County F.C. players
Shelbourne F.C. players
Manchester City F.C. players
Bradford City A.F.C. players
League of Ireland players
English Football League players
Association football forwards
Irish sprinters
Irish rugby union players
Bective Rangers players